The Federation of Family History Societies, also known as The Federation, is a United Kingdom-based charitable organisation. In 2019 it rebranded to the Family History Federation

Its stated principal aims are "to co-ordinate and assist the work of societies or other bodies interested in family history, genealogy and heraldry; to foster the spirit of mutual co-operation, by sponsoring projects in these fields".

Its membership consists of over 170 family history societies and similar genealogical organisations. It publishes The National Burial Index from data supplied largely by family history societies.

In January 2014, The National Archives put online the digitised records of over 8,000 individuals seeking exemption from conscription into the army in Middlesex during the First World War. The Federation assisted in funding this exercise. In the same month, The National Archives announced work to accelerate progress with the revision of the Manorial Documents Register and that funding from The Federation will help meet the cost of four additional county projects over the following two years. The relevant counties are Northumberland, Northamptonshire, Wiltshire and Kent.

The current Chairman is Stephen Manning.

Arms

Notes

External links 

 FFHS website

Family history societies in the United Kingdom